Khmelyovka is a rural locality (a selo) and the administrative center of Khmelyovsky Selsoviet, Zarinsky District, Altai Krai, Russia. The population was 1,072 as of 2013. There are 16 streets.

Geography 
Khmelyovka is located 42 km northeast of Zarinsk (the district's administrative centre) by road. Novodresvyanka is the nearest rural locality.

References 

Rural localities in Zarinsky District